Väinö Elias Bremer (24 April 1899 – 23 December 1964) was a Finnish biathlete, modern pentathlete, and pilot who competed in the 1924 Winter Olympics and in the 1924 Summer Olympics. He was born in Turku.

In 1924 Winter Games he was a member of the Finnish military patrol team which won the silver medal. He also competed in the 1924 Summer Games and finished seventh in the Modern pentathlon event.

After Olympic competition Bremer pursued aviation, including as a Captain in the Finnish Air Force. In 1927 he won the Finnish Harmon Trophy. He flew from Helsinki to Cape Town and back in 1933 in a Junkers A50 Junior, which was displayed in the Helsinki Airport from 1976 to 2018.

He was killed in a plane crash in Kerava, Finland.

References

External links

1899 births
1964 deaths
Sportspeople from Turku
Finnish military patrol (sport) runners
Finnish male modern pentathletes
Olympic biathletes of Finland
Olympic modern pentathletes of Finland
Military patrol competitors at the 1924 Winter Olympics
Modern pentathletes at the 1924 Summer Olympics
Olympic silver medalists for Finland
Victims of aviation accidents or incidents in Finland
Medalists at the 1924 Winter Olympics